Rebecca Shoichet (born February 16, 1975) is a Canadian voice actress and singer who has voiced in English dubs of Japanese anime and other shows for Ocean Productions in Vancouver, having moved there from Victoria in 2000. She took over Saffron Henderson's role of Sota Higurashi in Inuyasha after Henderson had moved to Los Angeles to do anime dubbing work in the United States. Other major roles include Mayura Labatt in Mobile Suit Gundam Seed and Nana Osaki in Nana. In animation, she voices Sunset Shimmer and sings for her and Twilight Sparkle in the  My Little Pony: Friendship is Magic series. Outside of voice acting, she has sung in the local bands Mimosa, Side One and Soulstream. She is also active in the theater productions at Vancouver Playhouse.

Shoichet also serves as a part-time instructor at the On The Mic Training voice-over training school in Vancouver.

Filmography

Anime

Animation

Film

Notes

References

External links
 
 
 Rebecca Shoichet at the CrystalAcids Anime Voice Actor Database
 

1975 births
Living people
Actresses from Ontario
Actresses from Vancouver
Canadian film actresses
Canadian television actresses
Canadian voice actresses
Musicians from Ontario
Musicians from Vancouver
20th-century Canadian actresses
21st-century Canadian actresses
20th-century Canadian women singers
21st-century Canadian women singers
Jewish Canadian actresses
Jewish Canadian musicians